Babu Genu Said (1 January 1908 – 12 December 1930) was a mill-worker in Bombay who led protests against the trade practices of British companies in India.

Said was born in a poor farmer family in Mahalunge Padwal; he worked in a cotton mill in Bombay. He was a participant in the protests, organized by Indian independence activists, against the import of foreign-made cloth.

On 12 December 1930, a cloth merchant named George Frazier of Manchester was moving loads of foreign-made cloth from his shop in old Hanuman galli in the Fort region to Mumbai Port. He was given police protection as per his request. The activists begged not to move the truck, but the police forced the protesters aside and managed to get the truck moving. Near Bhangwadi on Kalbadevi Road, Said stood in front of the truck, shouting praises for Mahatma Gandhi. The police officer ordered the driver to drive the truck over Said, but the driver refused, saying: "I am Indian and he is also Indian, So, we both are the brothers of each other, then how can I murder my brother?". After that, the English police officer drove the truck over Said and crushed him. This resulted in a huge wave of protests throughout Mumbai.

The landmarks bearing Shahid Babu Genu's name include:
 Babu Genu Ground in Navi Mumbai, Maharashtra, India
 Babu Genu said Wadi, in Mahalunge Padwal, Pune District, Maharashtra, India
 Babu Genu Chowk, in Pune, Maharashtra, India
Shahid Babu Genu Road in South Delhi

The corner across KEM hospital in Parel, Mumbai is named after Babu Genu, with his bust on display as Hutatma Babu Genu

Hutatma Babu Genu Ganpati in Budhwar Peth, Pune, India.

See also
List of cases of police brutality in India During British Rule

References

External links
 An Unsung Martyr, Times of India, 14 August 2008, retrieved on 30 December 2010.
 Babu Genu, A Swadeshi Martyr, 24 December 2007, retrieved on 30 December 2010.

1930 deaths
1908 births
Indian independence activists from Maharashtra
Police misconduct in India